Neomphalus fretterae is a species of sea snail, a marine gastropod mollusk in the family Neomphalidae.

This species common name is the Galapagos rift limpet

References

External links

Neomphalidae
Gastropods described in 1981